The Ottoman Empire used anthems since its foundation in the late 13th century, but did not use a specific imperial or national anthem until the 19th century. During the reign of Mahmud II, when the military and imperial band were re-organized along Western European lines, Giuseppe Donizetti was invited to head the process. Donizetti Pasha, as he was known in the Ottoman Empire, composed the first Western European-style imperial anthem, the Mahmudiye Marşı.

As was the case in many 19th-century monarchies, such as the Austrian Empire, the anthem of the Ottoman Empire was an imperial anthem, not a national one, so it paid homage to a specific ruler. However, unlike Western Europe, where the same music was used with modified lyrics (e.g. Gott erhalte Franz den Kaiser and Marche Henri IV), a new anthem was composed after each Ottoman imperial succession. In 1844, as part of the Tanzimat reforms, the Mecidiye Marşı was declared as the first official Ottoman national anthem. The first official Ottoman national flag (which was in essence identical to the present-day Turkish flag) was also adopted in 1844.

Mahmudiye Marşı, March of Mahmud – for Mahmud II (1829–1839, 1918–1922), by Giuseppe Donizetti
Mecidiye Marşı, March of Mecid – for Abdulmejid I (1839–1861), by Giuseppe Donizetti 
Aziziye Marşı, March of Aziz – for Abdülaziz (1861–1876), by Callisto Guatelli 
Hamidiye Marşı, March of Hamid – for Abdul Hamid II (1876–1909), by Necip Paşa
Reşadiye Marşı, March of Reşad – for Mehmed V (1909–1918), by Italo Selvelli

After the start of the imperial anthem tradition, two Sultans did not have specific anthems composed. The first was Murad V, who reigned for 3 months in 1876, and the second was the last Sultan of the Ottoman Empire, Mehmed VI, who used the Mahmudiye Marşı anthem.

Only the Hamidiye Marşı and Reşadiye Marşı had lyrics, the first three anthems being purely instrumental. The lyrics of the Reşadiye Marşı seem to have been lost to history.

Lyrics 
Hamidiye Marşı

Ey velîni'met-i âlem şehinşâh-ı cihan
Taht-ı âlî baht-ı Osmaniye verdin izz ü şan
Sâye-i lûtf-i hümayûnunla âlem kâm-ran
Saltanatta çok zaman Sultan Hamid zevk et heman
Çok yaşa ey padişahım devletinle çok yaşa
Çok yaşa ey padişahım şevketinle çok yaşa

See also
İstiklâl Marşı, national anthem of the Republic of Turkey
Ottoman military band
Culture of the Ottoman Empire
Ottoman classical music

References

External links
Music Sheet of the Ottoman National March – Page 1
Music Sheet of the Ottoman National March – Page 2

Ottoman culture
Government of the Ottoman Empire
Historical national anthems
National symbols of Turkey
Royal anthems
Asian anthems
European anthems
African anthems